Yousef Suleiman al Ahmad (born 1956) is a Syrian economist and politician. He is the former minister of state.

Early life and education
Ahmad was born in Hasaka in 1956.  He earned a degree in economics from the University of Damascus in 1990, and a degree from the Institute of Social Sciences in Moscow.

Career
Ahmad was a member of the People's Assembly in 1994, and deputy head of the financial laws committee. He has been a member of the Politburo of the Syrian Communist Party since 1995. He served as minister of state in charge of administrative development affairs.

Sanctions
The UK government included Ahmad in the list of Syrian individuals on 26 March 2013 whose assets were frozen.

References

1957 births
Living people
People from Hama
Damascus University alumni
20th-century Syrian economists
Syrian ministers of state
21st-century Syrian economists